Louis Wells may refer to:

 L. M. Wells (1862–1923), American actor
 Louis T. Wells (born 1937), American organizational theorist